Erik Hjalmar Frisell (27 August 1880 – 27 May 1967) was a Swedish military officer and sport shooter who competed in the 1912 Summer Olympics. During the 1918 Finnish Civil War he was the commander of the voluntary Swedish Brigade.

Life 
Frisell was born in Stavnäs, Värmland County. His father was the owner of the Stömne bruk ironworks. Frisell served as an artillery officer in Uppsala but retired in 1910. In 1918, he was recruited as the commander of the Swedish Brigade, a voluntary brigade fighting with the Whites in the Finnish Civil War. Frisell took part in the Battle of Tampere in the March–April 1918. After the Finnish Civil War, Frisell lived 10 years in Kenya where he assisted the British Army in railway constructions. Frisell published two biographies of his years in Africa. Hjalmar Frisell died in Stockholm in 1967.

Sports career 
In 1912 Frisell was part of the Swedish team which finished fourth in the team clay pigeons event. In the individual trap competition he finished 29th and in the 100 metre running deer, double shots event he finished twelfth.

Works 
Die Sjöquist'sche Richtmethode und ihre Anwendung bei Mitraillensen (1907)
Sju år i tält bland vita och svarta: sällskapsliv, arbete och äventyr i Kenya (1937)
Leva farligt i Afrika (1939)

References

1880 births
1967 deaths
Swedish Army officers
People of the Finnish Civil War (White side)
Swedish male sport shooters
Trap and double trap shooters
Running target shooters
Olympic shooters of Sweden
Shooters at the 1912 Summer Olympics
Burials at Norra begravningsplatsen
People from Arvika Municipality
Swedish expatriates in Finland
Swedish expatriates in Kenya
Sportspeople from Värmland County